MyPhoneExplorer is a proprietary freeware desktop application allowing management of Android mobile phones. It is developed in Austria, originally for the Sony Ericsson mobile phone.

Features
MyPhoneExplorer can connect to a phone using a USB cable, Wi-Fi, Bluetooth or infrared connections. Once connected, address book entries can be synchronised between the phone and MyPhoneExplorer, Microsoft Outlook, Microsoft Outlook Express, Mozilla Thunderbird or Google Mail. Calendar entries can also be synchronised with many systems, including Google Calendar.

As with the PC Suite software which is normally shipped with Sony Ericsson mobiles, files can be dragged and dropped to and from the phone's memory and memory stick. Notably, however, MyPhoneExplorer also allows calls to be managed (i.e. dialed and answered) from within the application, and allows SMS text messages to be saved, read, written, sent, etc. directly from a PC.
Moreover, it provides feature of back-up and restore which can back up everything like messages, contacts, calendar entries, and files.

Supported phones
MyPhoneExplorer supports all Android phones running Android 1.6 or higher, since version 1.8. To establish a connection with Android phones, install "MyPhoneExplorer Client" from Google Play on the phone.

MyPhoneExplorer was initially designed for use with Sony Ericsson K700, K750, K800 mobiles, but FJ Software state that it works with all Sony Ericsson phones which are not Symbian-based.

Later versions of the software has support for some Symbian based Sony Ericsson phone although some older models are unsupported or require workarounds.

Bundled Applications
In the past, MyPhoneExplorer was bundled with MixiDj Toolbar, DoNotTrackMe, and RegClean Pro. During installation of MyPhoneExplorer you were given an option to opt out of the bundled applications.

Since March 2015, the software does not come with bundled applications anymore.

Language translation
Text displayed in MyPhoneExplorer (e.g. in column headings, message boxes, etc.) is read up from installed language files (e.g. English.lng), thereby allowing translation to other languages. MyPhoneExplorer comes with instructions on how to create new language files and there are approximately 40 languages for which such language files have been created (as of 14 October 2007).

References

External links
MyPhoneExplorer Download Page
FJ Software Development
FJ Software Support Forum
YouTube introductory video and new developments for MyPhoneExplorer/EccoPro bundle
Home and support base for EccoPro bundled with MyPhoneExplorer

Windows-only freeware
Mobile device management software